Christian theology sometimes refers to Jesus using the title Redeemer. This refererences the salvation he accomplished, and is based on the metaphor of redemption, or "buying back". In the New Testament, redemption can refer both to deliverance from sin and to freedom from captivity.

Although the gospels do not use the title "Redeemer", the idea of redemption occurs in several of Paul's letters. Leon Morris says that "Paul uses the concept of redemption primarily to speak of the saving significance of the death of Christ."

Universality
The New Testament speaks of Christ as the one Saviour for all people. The First Epistle of John says that Jesus is "the propitiation for our sins and not for ours only but also for the sins of the world" (1 John 2:2). Adherents of unlimited atonement interpret this to mean that Jesus' redemptive role is for all people without exception, while adherents of limited atonement interpret it as being for all people without distinction—for Gentiles as well as Jews.

The first Christians also recognized Jesus' redemptive role to be unique (without parallel), complete (as one who conveys the fullness of salvation), and definitive (beyond any possibility of being equaled, let alone surpassed, in his salvific function). In particular, his universal role means that through him the deadly forces of evil are overcome, sin is forgiven, their contamination purified, and the new existence as God's beloved, adopted children has been made available. This New Testament sense of Christ's indispensable and necessary role for human salvation could be summarized by a new axiom: extra Christum nulla salus ("outside Christ no salvation"). This sense of his all-determining role in the whole redemptive drama is suggested by a fact: unlike the Old Testament, where various human beings could be called "saviour" (e.g., Judges 3: 9, 15, and 31), the New Testament gives the title "Saviour" only to God (eight times) and to Christ (sixteen times).

See also
 Christology
 Jesus as the Logos
 Jesus in Christianity
 Names and titles of Jesus in the New Testament
 Messiah § Christianity
 Second Adam

References

Bibliography 

 Borgen, Peder. Early Christianity and Hellenistic Judaism. Edinburgh: T & T Clark Publishing. 1996.
 Brown, Raymond. An Introduction to the New Testament. New York: Doubleday. 1997.
 Dunn, J. D. G. Christology in the Making. London: SCM Press. 1989.
 Ferguson, Everett. Backgrounds in Early Christianity. Grand Rapids: Eerdmans Publishing. 1993.
 Greene, Colin J. D. Christology in Cultural Perspective: Marking Out the Horizons. Grand Rapids: InterVarsity Press. Eerdmans Publishing. 2003.
 Holt, Bradley P. Thirsty for God: A Brief History of Christian Spirituality. Minneapolis: Fortress Press. 2005.
 Letham, Robert. The Work of Christ. Downers Grove: InterVarsity Press. 1993.
 Macleod, Donald. The Person of Christ. Downers Grove: InterVarsity Press. 1998.
 McGrath, Alister. Historical Theology: An Introduction to the History of Christian Thought. Oxford: Blackwell Publishing. 1998.
 Macquarrie, J. Jesus Christ in Modern Thought. London: SCM Press. 1990.
 Neusner, Jacob. From Politics to Piety: The Emergence of Pharisaic Judaism. Providence, R.I.: Brown University. 1973.
 Norris, Richard A. Jr. The Christological Controversy. Philadelphia: Fortress Press. 1980.
 O'Collins, Gerald. Christology: A Biblical, Historical, and Systematic Study of Jesus. Oxford:Oxford University Press. 2009.
 O'Collins, Gerald. Jesus: A Portrait. London: Darton, Longman & Todd. 2008.
 O'Collins, Gerald. Salvation for All: God's Other Peoples. Oxford:Oxford University Press. 2008.
 Pelikan, Jaroslav. Development of Christian Doctrine: Some Historical Prolegomena. London: Yale University Press. 1969.
 Pelikan, Jaroslav. The Emergence of the Catholic Tradition (100–600). Chicago: University of Chicago Press. 1971.
 Rahner, Karl. Foundations of Christian Faith, trans. W.V. Dych. London: Darton, Longman & Todd. 1978.
 Tyson, John R. Invitation to Christian Spirituality: An Ecumenical Anthology. New York: Oxford University Press. 1999.

Biblical phrases
Christian terminology
Christology
Christian soteriology